Misia Remix 2003 Kiss in the Sky: Non Stop Mix is Misia's fourth remix album, released on April 23, 2003. It sold 31,648 copies in its first week and peaked at #3. Disc one is mixed by DJ Ta-shi whilst the second disc is mixed by DJ Gomi.

The album is certified Gold for shipment of 100,000 copies.

Track listing

Charts

Oricon Sales Chart

Physical Sales Charts

References

External links
Sony Music Online Japan : MISIA

Misia albums
2003 remix albums